Henry Joseph (Hank) Schmidt (September 28, 1935 – May 17, 2021) was an American professional football player who was a defensive tackle in the American Football League (AFL).

Professional career
Schmidt played collegiately at the University of Southern California and professionally between 1959 and 1966, starting with the National Football League's  San Francisco 49ers and moving to the new American Football League's San Diego Chargers in 1961. He played on the Buffalo Bills 1965 AFL Champions in 1965, earning a place in that year's AFL All-Star Team. He finished his professional football career in 1966 with the AFL's New York Jets.

He died on May 17, 2021, in La Mesa, California, at age 85.

See also
Other American Football League Players

References

1935 births
2021 deaths
Sportspeople from Los Angeles County, California
American football defensive tackles
USC Trojans football players
San Francisco 49ers players
San Diego Chargers players
Buffalo Bills players
New York Jets players
American Football League All-Star players
Players of American football from California
Trinity Tigers football players
American Football League players